The 2nd South Midland Mounted Brigade (later numbered as the 6th Mounted Brigade) was a yeomanry brigade of the British Army, formed as part of the Territorial Force in 1908.

It served dismounted in the Gallipoli Campaign before being remounted to serve in the Sinai and Palestine Campaign in the First World War.

In April 1918, it was merged with elements of the 5th (Mhow) Cavalry Brigade to form 10th Cavalry Brigade. It remained in Palestine after the end of the war on occupation duties.

Formation

Under the terms of the Territorial and Reserve Forces Act 1907 (7 Edw.7, c.9), the brigade was formed in 1908 as part of the Territorial Force. It consisted of three yeomanry regiments, a horse artillery battery and ammunition column, a transport and supply column and a field ambulance.

As the name suggests, the units were drawn from the southern part of the English Midlands, predominantly Berkshire, Buckinghamshire and Oxfordshire.

First World War

2nd South Midland Mounted Brigade
The brigade was embodied on 4 August 1914 upon the outbreak of the First World War.  Initially, it concentrated in Berkshire and on 5 August 1914 joined the 1st Mounted Division. On 2 September it was transferred to the 2nd Mounted Division and in mid November 1914 it moved with its division to Norfolk on coastal defence duties.

On 19 September 1914, the Queen's Own Oxfordshire Hussars was posted to the BEF, joining the 4th Cavalry Brigade. The Queen's Own Dorset Yeomanry joined in the same month to replace them.

Egypt
In April 1915, the 2nd Mounted Division moved to Egypt arriving at Alexandria between 19 and 21 April and was posted to Cairo by the middle of May. In May 1915 the brigade was designated 2nd (2nd South Midland) Mounted Brigade.

It was dismounted in August 1915 and took part in the Gallipoli Campaign.  Each regiment left a squadron headquarters and two troops (about 100 officers and men) in Egypt to look after the horses.

Gallipoli
The brigade landed at "A" Beach, Suvla Bay on 18 August and moved into bivouacs at Lala Baba on 20 August. On 21 August it advanced to Chocolate Hill via Salt Lake and Hetman Chair and took part in the attack on Scimitar Hill.

Due to losses during the Battle of Scimitar Hill and wastage during August 1915, the 2nd Mounted Division had to be reorganised. On 4 September 1915, the 1st Composite Mounted Brigade was formed from the 1st (1st South Midland), 2nd (2nd South Midland) and 5th (Yeomanry) Mounted Brigades.  The brigade formed a battalion sized unit 2nd South Midland Regiment.  The brigade embarked for Mudros on 31 October and returned to Egypt in December 1915 where it was reformed and remounted.

6th Mounted Brigade

The brigade left the 2nd Mounted Division on 17 January 1916 and was sent to the Western Frontier of Egypt as an independent formation. On 31 March 1916, the remaining Mounted Brigades were numbered in a single sequence. As a consequence, the 2nd South Midland Mounted Brigade was redesignated as 6th Mounted Brigade.

The brigade served with the Western Frontier Force from January to October 1916.  It joined the newly formed Imperial Mounted Division in January 1917 and took part in the First and Second Battles of Gaza. The 17th Machine Gun Squadron was formed on 12 January 1917.

The complete brigade was transferred to the newly formed Yeomanry Mounted Division on 27 June 1917, joining it at el Maraqeb. From 31 October it took part in the Third Battle of Gaza, including the Battle of Beersheba and the Capture of the Sheria Position. It took part in the Battle of Mughar Ridge on 13 and 14 November and the Battle of Nebi Samwil from 17 to 24 November. From 27 to 29 November, it withstood the Turkish counter-attacks during the Capture of Jerusalem.

10th Cavalry Brigade

In March 1918, the 1st Indian Cavalry Division was broken up in France.  The British units (notably 6th (Inniskilling) Dragoons, 17th Lancers, 1/1st Queen's Own Yorkshire Dragoons and A, Q and U Batteries RHA) remained in France and the Indian elements were sent to Egypt.

By an Egyptian Expeditionary Force GHQ Order of 12 April 1918, the mounted troops of the EEF were reorganised when the Indian Army units arrived in theatre. On 24 April 1918, the Yeomanry Mounted Division was indianized and its title was changed to 1st Mounted Division, the third distinct division to bear this title.

On 24 April 1918, the 6th Mounted Brigade was merged with elements of the 5th (Mhow) Cavalry Brigade:
the Queen's Own Dorset Yeomanry remained with the brigade
the Royal Buckinghamshire Hussars and the Berkshire Yeomanry left the brigade on 4 April and were merged to form C Battalion, Machine Gun Corps.  It was posted to France, arriving on 28 June
2nd Lancers (Gardner's Horse) joined from 5th (Mhow) Cavalry Brigade
38th King George's Own Central India Horse joined from 5th (Mhow) Cavalry Brigade
17th Machine Gun Squadron remained with the brigade
6th Mounted Brigade Signal Troop remained with the brigade
on 11 May, 2/South Midland Cavalry Field Ambulance merged with Mhow Cavalry Field Ambulance to form 6th Combined Cavalry Field Ambulance
on 11 May, 4/1st North Midland Mobile Veterinary Section merged with Mhow Mobile Veterinary Section to form 6th Mobile Veterinary Section
On 22 July 1918, the 1st Mounted Division was renumbered as the 4th Cavalry Division and the brigade as 10th Cavalry Brigade.  The sub units (Signal Troop, Combined Cavalry Field Ambulance and Mobile Veterinary Section) were renumbered on the same date.

The brigade remained with 4th Cavalry Division for the rest of the war, taking part in the Battle of Megiddo and the Capture of Damascus.

After the Armistice of Mudros, the brigade remained with 4th Cavalry Division in Palestine as part of the occupation forces.  However, demobilization began immediately and by May 1919 most of the British units had been repatriated.  The division was finally broken up in 1921.

Commanders
The 2nd South Midland Mounted Brigade / 6th Mounted Brigade / 10th Cavalry Brigade had the following commanders:

See also

 2/2nd South Midland Mounted Brigade for the 2nd Line formation
 10th Indian Cavalry Brigade existed at the same time but was unrelated other than having the same number
 British yeomanry during the First World War

Notes

References

Bibliography
 
 
 
 
 
 
 

CB10
Cavalry brigades of the British Indian Army
Military units and formations established in 1908
Military units and formations disestablished in 1921